165P/LINEAR is a periodic comet in the Solar System. 165P/LINEAR has a perihelion distance of 6.8 AU, and is a Chiron-type comet with (TJupiter smaller than 3 and a semi-major axis larger than Jupiter's).

References

External links 
 Orbital simulation from JPL (Java) / Horizons Ephemeris
 165P on Seiichi Yoshida's comet list

Periodic comets
Chiron-type comets
0165